Zhang Meng (born 22 January 2000) is a Chinese footballer.

Club career
Born in Dingxi, Gansu, Zhang trained in the academies of Shandong Luneng Taishan and Chongqing Dangdai Lifan. He moved to Serbia to join Sinđelić Beograd, training with the club's under-19 team. He made his debut in September 2019.

Career statistics

Club

Notes

References

2000 births
Living people
People from Dingxi
Footballers from Gansu
Chinese footballers
Association football midfielders
Serbian First League players
Shandong Taishan F.C. players
Chongqing Liangjiang Athletic F.C. players
FK Sinđelić Beograd players
Chinese expatriate footballers
Chinese expatriate sportspeople in Serbia
Expatriate footballers in Serbia